The athletics competition at the 2006 Central American and Caribbean Games took place at the Estadio Pedro de Heredia in Cartagena, Colombia and lasted from July 25 to July 29. There were 23 events for men and 21 for women. A total of ten Games records were broken at the competition, in addition to a number of national records.

The events were dominated by Cuban athletes, whereas teams like Jamaica did not send their strongest athletes. With 21 gold medals, Cuba won nearly half of the events and 45 medals were won by the country's athletes. Mexico was the next most successful nation, winning eight golds and fourteen medals overall. The hosts Colombia took third place on the medal tally, having won four golds, but also had the second greatest medal haul with nineteen in total. Jamaica, the Netherlands Antilles and Panama were the only other nations at the competition to win two golds or more.

Results

Men

Women

Medal table

Note: Medal count excludes Dorian Scott's gold in the men's shot put as he was disqualified from the competition after a positive test for marijuana.

Participating nations

 (6)
 (19)
 (10)
 (3)
 (2)
 (7)
 (4)
 (49)
 (3)
 (61)
 (5)
 (36)
 (4)
 (13)
 (3)
 (7)
 (11)
 (39)
 (38)
 (4)
 (2)
 (7)
 (26)
 (13)
 (6)
 (4)
 (4)
 (1)
 (23)
 (6)
 (28)

References

 Results
  
 
 
 Reports
 Robinson, Javier Clavelo (2006-07-24). Athletics ready to start - 20th Central American and Caribbean Games - PREVIEW. IAAF. Retrieved on 2010-08-21.
 Robinson, Javier Clavelo (2006-07-26). Guevara and Martinez shine - CAC Games, Day One. IAAF. Retrieved on 2010-08-21.
 Robinson, Javier Clavelo (2006-07-27). Robles and Martina break Games records - CAC Games Day Two. IAAF. Retrieved on 2010-08-21.
 Robinson, Javier Clavelo (2006-07-28). Betanzos, Moreno, Cumbá lead Cuban sweep - CAC Games Day 3. IAAF. Retrieved on 2010-08-21.
 Robinson, Javier Clavelo (2006-07-30). Cuba dominates last day - CAC Games, Day 5. IAAF. Retrieved on 2010-08-21.

Athletics
Central American and Caribbean Games
2006